Girvies L. Davis (January 20, 1958 – May 17, 1995) and Richard "Ricky" Holman (born August 20, 1961) were American serial killers who killed at least four people during robberies in Illinois between 1978 and 1979. Davis, the older of the two, told an investigator that shooting witnesses was "easier" than wearing a mask. The two were nicknamed "The .22 Caliber Killers". Davis was executed in 1995, while Holman, too young to be executed, is serving a life sentence.

Davis and Holman committed their crimes at the same time and in the same region as Andre Jones and Freddie Tiller. Consequently, all four men received extensive local media coverage.

Early life 
Davis, one of eight children, grew up in poverty in East St. Louis. His 4th grade teacher, Annie Quinley Petchulat, described him as "a poor pathetic boy who just sat there and said nothing." Before the murders, Davis was known by the police as a small-time thief, a re-seller of stolen goods, and an alcoholic.

Murders, arrest, and trial 
On December 8, 1978, Davis and Holman allegedly robbed and murdered 78-year-old Frieda Mueller. The two were alleged to have fatally shot her before stealing her television set, billfold, and checkbook. Davis and Holman were never tried for killing Frieda, but her murder was mentioned during their trials.

On December 22, 1978, 89-year-old Charles Biebel, who used a wheelchair, was fatally shot inside his trailer home. His daughter, Jean Biebel Moore, discovered his body later that evening. Davis and Holman stole two watches, a billfold, "a number of guns," and a television set. Holman was the triggerman for this murder. Before they were arrested, Jean Moore offered a $5,000 reward for information leading to the arrest and conviction of her father's killers.

On May 12, 1979, Davis and Holman robbed and murdered 84-year-old John Oertel in his trailer. Oertel was shot and stabbed. Davis was the triggerman for this murder.

On July 13, 1979, Davis and Holman shot 83-year-old Esther Sepmeyer, a blind woman, execution-style as she was kneeling in front of her bed, praying for her life. Her grandson, Rodney Sepmeyer, found her body. A lawnmower, a replica antique radio, a stereo, a color TV, and a .22-caliber semi-automatic rifle were stolen. Holman was triggerman for this murder.

Davis and Holman were arrested after a botched hold-up at an auto parts store. When the two entered the store, the two immediately shot the owner, James Ostman. The bullet struck him in the arm. As Ostman fell, his clerk, 21-year-old Frank Cash, ran to the back of the store. Davis and Holman followed Cash, and Davis fatally shot the man as he pleaded for his life. Hearing the shots, a wounded Ostman grabbed his own pistol, confronted the two, and fired two shots at them, the first "with his eyes closed", and the second as the robbers fled. Davis suffered a gunshot wound to the back and was taken to the hospital. Davis was arrested on August 30, 1979, after medical personnel called the police. Holman was arrested a few weeks later.

Officials ultimately linked Davis to 10 robberies, with nine people dead and seven wounded.

The alleged and confirmed victims were: Frieda Miller, 78; Edward Campbell, 35; Mary Prestito, 39; Charles Biebel, 89; Marvin Fourt, 25; James Perdue, 63; John Oertel, 84; Esther Sepmeyer, 83; and Frank Cash, 21. Davis and Holman were never tried for all of the murders since both of them had already received the maximum sentence allowed. Prosecutors later said the duo had committed so many murders that they thought prosecuting every case wasn’t worth the effort.

John Crangle was an employee for Perdue, one of Davis's alleged victims. Crangle was shot four times and died of his injuries six years later, at the age of 52, having suffered three bullets to the abdomen and one to the throat. Crangle's daughter said he had identified Davis as the man who shot him and his boss.

Davis was convicted of four counts of murder for killing Charles Biebel, John Oertel, Frank Cash, and Esther Sepmeyer. He was also convicted of attempted murder for the shooting of John Ostman. During his sentencing hearing, Davis's wife, Cindy, testified that he was not a violent man and she would visit him in prison if he was spared execution. Davis received a 30-year sentence for the shooting of Ostman, an 80-year sentence for killing Oertel and Cash, and a death sentence for killing Biebel. He received another death sentence for killing Sepmeyer, but this was reduced to life without parole on appeal. Although Davis was not present for Biebel's murder, he was convicted under the felony murder rule, on the grounds that after committing similar robbery-slayings with Holman, he should've been well aware that Holman would kill Biebel.

Holman was convicted of three counts of murder for killing Oertel, Cash, and Sepmeyer, and the attempted murder of Ostman. He received a 75-year sentence for killing Oertel and Cash and a concurrent 25-year sentence for the shooting of Ostman. Holman was sentenced to life in prison without parole for killing Sepmeyer, avoiding a death sentence since he was barely a month shy of 18 at the time. The judge told Holman that he did not believe he could be rehabilitated since he had shown no remorse, and that the life term was necessary to protect the public. He was never tried for killing Biebel.

Another man, Keith Harris, was wrongfully convicted of the attempted murder of Mark Resmann and sentenced to 50 years in prison in 1979. On December 4, 1978, Resmann, a gas station clerk, was shot seven times, but survived, after giving $200 to two robbers. Although Resmann identified Harris in a lineup, no physical evidence linked him to the crime.

Davis and Holman had confessed to the crime and ballistic evidence linked them to the shooting of Resmann, and police now believe they were responsible for the crime.

Harris was released from prison on May 1, 2001, after his sentence was reduced to 30 years. Governor George Ryan granted him a full pardon in 2003. Harris received $154,153 in compensation for the time he spent in prison.

Davis’s claim of partial innocence 
Davis conceded his involvement in two robberies in which the victims were slain, but denied his guilt in the killing of Biebel, the crime which sent him to death row, and denied having personally committing any murders.

Although the confession of Holman, who never denied any of the murders, implicated Davis in additional murders in which he was alleged to be the triggerman, Davis argued that his own confession had been physically coerced by investigators, and alleged they had threatened to kill him if he did not talk. The police denied all of these allegations.

In response to protesters asking for Davis’s death sentence to be commuted to life in prison, prosecutors said they were prepared to try him for the other murders they believed he had committed if he was taken off of death row.

At Davis's clemency hearing, numerous relatives of his victims asked the Illinois Prisoner Review Board to recommend clemency. Pam Cash, the widow of Frank Cash, who had given birth to her first child only 30 hours after her husband was murdered, said someone responsible for so many murders did not deserve any mercy. Jean Biebel Moore described finding her father's body while delivering groceries three days before Christmas. "I found him sitting in his wheelchair dead, with a bloody wound in his chest," she said. "For the past 16 years, I have tried to erase that image from my mind, but I have not succeeded."

Davis's imprisonment and execution 
While on death row, Davis learned to read and became an ordained minister, serving as a spiritual adviser to other inmates. After numerous failed appeals and a failed clemency petition to Governor Jim Edgar, he was executed by lethal injection in 1995. Davis declined a last meal and his last words were "I wish Godspeed to all." He was pronounced dead at 12:28 a.m.

Aftermath 
Holman remains in prison to this day, and is serving his sentence at Pontiac Correctional Center. In recent years, he has tried to have his life sentence reduced to a term of years under the Miller v. Alabama and Montgomery v. Louisiana rulings, which limited life terms without parole for minors. However, Holman's efforts have been unsuccessful, and his life sentence stands as of 2022.

See also
 Capital punishment in Illinois
 List of people executed in Illinois
 List of serial killers in the United States
 List of people executed by lethal injection

References

20th-century American criminals
20th-century executions by Illinois
20th-century executions of American people
American male criminals
American people convicted of murder
Criminal duos
Executed American serial killers
Executed people from Illinois
Male serial killers
People convicted of murder by Illinois
People executed by Illinois by lethal injection
People from East St. Louis, Illinois